Spellman Lake is the name for two small lakes (North and South Spellman Lake), located 8 miles south of Clarkfield in Normania Township of Yellow Medicine County, Minnesota.  The lakes and much of the surrounding area are designated as  federal waterfowl production areas.  There are also state owned public hunting grounds near the lakes.  Nontoxic shot is required for all shooting in the area.  The use of airboats on North and South Spellman Lakes is prohibited by law at all times.  A public water access is maintained on the north lake by the Minnesota Department of Natural Resources.
Hunters should be careful not to shoot protected birds such as bald eagles and swans that frequent the area.

The Minnesota Department of Natural Resources began a drawdown of the lakes on November 28, 2006.  The water level was brought down to eliminate fish such as carp and bullheads.  The water was drained through the summer of 2007, and allowed to refill through precipitation after enough vegetation had grown.  There were no plans to stock fish into the lakes and they are managed as a fish-less system.  The shallows depths of the lakes make the survival of game fish unlikely.

See also

References

Lakes of Yellow Medicine County, Minnesota
Lakes of Minnesota